Xuân La may refer to places in Vietnam:
 Xuân La, Tây Hồ, Hanoi, an archeological site
 Xuân La, Pác Nặm, Bắc Kạn Province